Norton Priory is the former rectory of St Wilfrid's Chapel, Church Norton, West Sussex. The building is claimed to be of mediaeval origin, but so altered that much of the history of its construction is speculation. Some parts are from the 17th century, while a fireplace in the west wing bears the inscription "WL 1539".

References

External links
Norton Priory, Selsey, West Sussex at britishlistedbuildings.co.uk
Norton Priory, Selsey, West Sussex at Historic England

Grade II listed buildings in West Sussex
Chichester District
Populated coastal places in West Sussex